Anacampsis languens is a moth of the family Gelechiidae. It was described by Edward Meyrick in 1918. It is found in Ecuador.

The wingspan is about 14 mm. The forewings are whitish-grey, irregularly sprinkled black and with a moderate blackish streak from the dorsum at one-fifth, reaching two-thirds across the wing. There is a small spot of black irroration in the disc at two-thirds and a suffused whitish double spot on the costa at three-fourths, preceded by a small spot of blackish suffusion. Two black dots are found on the upper part of the termen. The hindwings are light grey.

References

Moths described in 1918
Anacampsis
Moths of South America